Darrick Bollinger (born 8 August 1978) is a Guamanian freestyle swimmer. He competed in two events at the 1996 Summer Olympics.

References

External links
 

1978 births
Living people
Guamanian male freestyle swimmers
Olympic swimmers of Guam
Swimmers at the 1996 Summer Olympics
Place of birth missing (living people)